This article is a list of historic places in Labrador entered on the Canadian Register of Historic Places, whether they are federal, provincial, or municipal.

List of historic places

See also
 List of historic places in Newfoundland and Labrador
 List of National Historic Sites of Canada in Newfoundland and Labrador

Labrador